Lanildut is a commune in the Finistère department of Brittany in north-western France.

Population
Inhabitants of Lanildut are called in French Lanildutiens.

See also
Communes of the Finistère department

References

External links
Official website 

Mayors of Finistère Association 

Communes of Finistère